The following lists events that happened in 2009 in Iceland.

Incumbents
President – Ólafur Ragnar Grímsson 
Prime Minister – Geir Haarde (until 1 February), Jóhanna Sigurðardóttir (starting 1 February)

 
2000s in Iceland
Iceland
Iceland
Years of the 21st century in Iceland